Jiří Zimola (born 28 March 1971) is a Czech Social Democrat politician, who served as Governor of the South Bohemian Region from 2008 until his resignation in 2017. Zimola left the Social Democratic Party in 2020 and became leader of a new party called Change 2020.

Biography
He studied at the University of South Bohemia in České Budějovice, working as a teacher after he finished his studies.

Political career
Zimola entered politics in 1998 and became Mayor of Nová Bystřice. He became a member of the Czech Social Democratic Party in 2000. In 2008, Zimola became Governor of the South Bohemian region and gave up his position as Mayor. He was forced to resign in 2017 due to a controversy related to his cottage at Lipno nad Vltavou.

He founded a political platform called Let's save ČSSD after the 2017 legislative election.

References 

1971 births
Living people
Politicians from Třebíč
Czech Social Democratic Party governors
Czech Social Democratic Party politicians
Mayors of places in the Czech Republic
Czech Social Democratic Party MPs
University of South Bohemia alumni
Members of the Chamber of Deputies of the Czech Republic (2013–2017)
Czech Social Democratic Party mayors